Naalukettu is a Malayalam novel written by M. T. Vasudevan Nair. Published in 1958, it was MT's first major novel. The title attributes to Nālukettu, a traditional ancestral home (Taravad) of a Nair joint family. Like many other novels written by MT, Naalukettu is also set against the backdrop of the crumbling matrilineal order of Kerala in a newly independent India.

Naalukettu remains a classic in Malayalam fiction. It contributed to the renewal of a literary tradition initiated by S. K. Pottekkatt, Thakazhi Sivasankara Pillai and Uroob in the 1950s. It was given the Kerala Sahitya Akademi Award in 1959. It has had 23 reprints (as of 2008) and was translated into 14 languages and had a record sale of a half a million copies (as of 2008) and still features in the best-seller lists.

Doordarshan adapted the novel into a television film in 1995. Malayalam actor Krishnaprasad enacted the protagonist in this film. It won the Kerala State Television Award for the year 1996. A screenplay based on the novel was released on 8 December 2012 as part of the DC International Book Festival, Thiruvananthapuram.

Plot
Naalukettu is a veritable depiction of the matriarchal social order of Kerala's Nair community in its final gasp for life. The hero Appunni is a scion of a once rich and powerful family. Appunni is the son of a woman who married a man of her own choices and who did not marry the man whom her Karnavar suggested. So she has to leave the family with her son and Appunni grows up without a father and away from the prestige and protection of the matrilineal home to which he belongs. The novel captures the traumas and psychological graph of Appunni, an introvert and angry youth, aspiring to avenge the insult meted out to him in a matrilineal family by building a new edifice on the ruins of his ancestral home.

Reception
The Hindu'''s critic K. Kunhikrishnan comments: "Naalukettu was significant in that it fascinatingly portrayed the degeneration of the matrilineal system of joint families (tharawad), where large numbers of relatives lived together. The decline and collapse of the system resulted in nuclear families and consequential social, traditional and economic changes. But apart from the historical angle, Naalukettu has a lasting literary value, as one of the best in Malayalam fiction."

Translations
The novel has been translated to various Indian and foreign languages. The English translation is by:
 
The Arabic translation is by:
 Musthafa Wafy and Anas Wafy with the same title and published by Al-Madarek- Jeddha
The Konkani translation is by:
 Gokuldas Prabhu with the title Chavki''. This translation won the Sahitya Akademi Translation Prize in 2002.

References

External links
 Naalukettu at dcbooks.com

1958 novels
Malayalam novels
Indian novels adapted into films
Novels set in Kerala
Novels by M. T. Vasudevan Nair
Kerala Sahitya Akademi Award-winning works
DC Books books
20th-century Indian novels
1958 Indian novels